Jessica Tatti (born 22 April 1981) is a German politician. Born in Marbach am Neckar, Baden-Württemberg, she represents The Left. Jessica Tatti has served as a member of the Bundestag from the state of Baden-Württemberg since 2017.

Life 
She is of Italian descent. Her grandparents hail from Sardinia. Tatti studied social work at the Protestant University of Applied Sciences in Ludwigsburg and was employed in the corresponding professional field after her bachelor's degree: In 2010, she moved to Reutlingen and initially worked in urban youth work; before her parliamentary mandate in the German Bundestag, she most recently worked in social services in refugee care for the Esslingen district association of Arbeiterwohlfahrt (AWO). She became member of the bundestag after the 2017 German federal election. She is a member of the Committee for Labour and Social Affairs.

References

External links 

  
 Bundestag biography 

1981 births
Living people
People from Marbach am Neckar
Members of the Bundestag for Baden-Württemberg
Female members of the Bundestag
21st-century German women politicians
Members of the Bundestag 2017–2021
Members of the Bundestag for The Left
Members of the Bundestag 2021–2025
German people of Italian descent